Mangora placida, common name tuftlegged orbweaver, is a species of spider in the family Araneidae, found in North America.

References

Araneidae
Spiders described in 1847
Spiders of North America